This is a list of films which have placed number one at the weekend box office in Canada during 2004.

Weekend gross list

See also
List of Canadian films

References

Canada
2004
2004 in Canadian cinema